Studenets may refer to:
Studenets, Razgrad Province, a village in Loznitsa Municipality, Bulgaria
Studenets, Smolyan Province, a village in Chepelare Municipality, Bulgaria
Studenets, Russia, name of several rural localities in Russia